Peter Frankopan (born 22 March 1971) is a British historian, writer, and hotelier. He is a professor of global history at Worcester College, Oxford and the Director of the Oxford Centre for Byzantine Research. He is a fellow of the Royal Asiatic Society. He is best known for his 2015 book The Silk Roads.

Early life and education 
Frankopan is the second of five children born to Croatian Louis Doimi de Frankopan (1939–2018) and Swedish-born barrister and professor of international law Ingrid Detter. His elder sister is Lady Nicholas Windsor. His father is Louis Doimi de Lupis, who claimed to be a member of the Frankopan family.

He attended Eton College and then received a degree in Byzantine history from Jesus College, Cambridge, before getting his D.Phil at Corpus Christi College, Oxford. He is a senior research fellow at Worcester College, Oxford, and director of the Oxford Centre for Byzantine Research.

His areas of focus are the history of the Byzantine Empire, the Mediterranean, the Balkans, the Caucasus, and Russia, as well as the interdependence of Islam and Christianity. He has also studied Greek literature of the Middle Ages.

Writing career 
Frankopan's first book of history, The First Crusade: The Call from the East, was published in 2012. The book received a five-star review from Nicholas Shakespeare in The Telegraph. He called it a "persuasive and bracing work" and said "Peter Frankopan is not yet well known, but he deserves to be." Michael Dirda, in The Washington Post, praised this "carefully researched book." Thomas F. Madden, specialist on the Crusades, seems more critical: 

In 2015, Frankopan's book The Silk Roads: A New History of the World was published. Writing in the Telegraph, Bettany Hughes praised it as a "charismatic and essential book", while Anthony Sattin, writing in The Guardian, called it "ambitious" and "full of insight but let down by factual errors". Frankopan's follow-up book, The New Silk Roads: The Present and Future of the World (Bloomsbury Publishing), was published in 2018.

Hotels 
In 2002, Frankopan and his wife Jessica opened Cowley Manor, a boutique hotel and spa on a historic estate in the Cotswolds. They have since expanded their hotel chain, which they named A Curious Group of Hotels, to include the Portobello Hotel in London, Canal House in Amsterdam and L'Hotel Paris in Paris. The restaurant in L'Hotel Paris has been awarded a Michelin star.

Personal life 
He played for the Croatian national cricket team. In 2015, he said "That’s the achievement I’m proudest of – playing cricket for my country."  He also plays for the Authors XI cricket team with other British writers and contributed a chapter to the book that team members collectively wrote about their first season playing together, The Authors XI: A Season of English Cricket from Hackney to Hambledon (2013).

He and his wife Jessica, daughter of Sir Tim Sainsbury, have four children and live in Oxford. Together, they oversee a £14 million trust funded by her family's supermarket fortune.

Publications

Monographs
 
 
 
 
 The Earth Transformed: An Untold History, Bloomsbury, ISBN 9781526622563, 2023

Edited books
 The Hippodrome of Constantinople
 The Statues of Constantinople
 Encyclopaedia of the Bible and its reception
 The Chora Church of Constantinople

References

External links 
 Frankopan's personal website
 Frankopan's page at the Faculty of History of the University of Oxford

1971 births
Living people
Alumni of Jesus College, Cambridge
Alumni of Corpus Christi College, Oxford
Frankopan family
English people of Croatian descent
21st-century English historians
21st-century English non-fiction writers
People educated at Eton College
Fellows of the Royal Asiatic Society